Susanna Sonnenberg is the author of the best-selling memoirs Her Last Death and She Matters. Her Last Death reached #11 and She Matters reached #32 on The New York Times Best Seller list. Both memoirs received wide critical praise.

Michiko Kakutani of The New York Times described Last Death as a "fiercely observed, fluently written book that captures the chaos and confusions of [Sonnenberg's] youth" in "sharp, crystalline prose." The New  York Times review of She Matters said that Sonnenberg "demonstrates a self-awareness that is clearly hard-earned" and that the "determination to learn from the women who are close to her, to investigate where she failed and where they did, is what gives the book such resonance." Her essays have also been widely published in magazines such as Elle, O, The Oprah Magazine, and Parenting.

She is the daughter of Ben Sonnenberg, the American publisher and founder of the literary magazine Grand Street. Born in London and raised in New York, she now lives in Montana with her family.

Reviews of Her Last Death

New York Times 

Oprah Magazine 

Entertainment Weekly 

New York Observer 

San Francisco Chronicle 

Publishers Weekly 

The Book Lady's Blog 

Reviews of She Matters

New York Times 

Boston Globe 

Dallas News 

San Francisco Chronicle 

NPR 

Harpers Bazaar 

Book Passage 

Publishers Weekly 

Women's Voices for Change

References

External links
Interviews with Susanna Sonnenberg
LA Times
Drinking Diaries
Southeastern Review

Year of birth missing (living people)
Living people
American autobiographers
American memoirists